Abu Bakr Muhammad ibn Isa Abd al-Malik ibn Isa ibn Quzman al-Zuhri (1087–1160) was the single most famous poet in the history of Al-Andalus and he is also considered to be one of its most original. One of the characteristics of his poetry was "satire, verging on the licentious, aimed at religious experts." He deeply admired his "Eastern predecessor" Abu Nuwas.

Life
He was born and died in Cordoba during the reign of the Almoravids, to a family of possibly Gothic origins, while according to certain scholars he was from an Arab family. as his name suggests and from the fact that he described himself as being blond and blue-eyed in several of his zajals . After leading a lifestyle similar to that of troubadours, traveling to Seville, Granada and Jaén, he became a mosque imam towards the end of his life.

Diwan
Only 149 poems from the Diwan of Ibn Quzman appear in a manuscript in Saint Petersburg, which was the subject of a notice published in 1881. A facsimile edition of it titled Le Divan d'Ibn Guzman was published in 1896 in Berlin by Baron David von Günzburg. 

Most of the extant poems are zajals, the genre by which he earned his fame which are characterized by their colloquial language, as well as a typical rhyming scheme: aaab cccb dddb, where b rhymes with a constantly recurring refrain of one or two lines. As noted by James T. Monroe,

His approach to life as expressed in these melodious poems, together with their mixed idiom (occasionally using words of the Romance languages), shows a resemblance to the later vernacular troubadour poetry of France.

Translations
The Diwan has been translated in Spanish by Federico Corriente (under the title Cancionero hispanoárabe) and in English by Monroe.

References

Further reading
Menocal, María Rosa (EDT) /Scheindlin, Raymond P., "The Literature of Al-Andalus" (The Cambridge History of Arabic Literature) ch. 14,  (EDT) /Sells, Michael /Publisher: Cambridge Univ Press, 2000
Dr. Bonnie D. Irwin Dean, "Cooking With Ibn Quzman: Kitchen Imagery in Azjal  nos. 90, 68, and 118." Philological Association of the Pacific Coast Conference. Portland, 13 November 1988. 
Artifara, n. 1, (luglio - dicembre 2002), sezione Addenda La beauté des feux d'artifices dans les séries Netflix | Parlons des feux d'artifices, les artifices et effets spéciaux utilisés pour vous faire rêver ! .
A Middle East Studies Association conference was held in Anchorage, Alaska, 2003.
M. Th Houtsma, First encyclopaedia of Islam: 1913-1936 First Encyclopaedia of Islam: 1913-1936 (retrieved 36-09-2011)
"Cancionero de Abenguzmán" in Enciclopedia GER (in Spanish)

External links
 Le Divan d'Ibn Guzman

1087 births
1160 deaths
People from Córdoba, Spain
Poets from al-Andalus
Andalusi Arabic